Nikolaos (Nick) Stergiou (Greek: Νικόλαος Στεργίου; born in Thessaloniki, Greece on October 17, 1965) is the founding Chair of the Department of Biomechanics at University of Nebraska at Omaha (UNO), where he is also the Distinguished Community Research Chair and Professor. He is also the Director for the Center for Research in Human Movement Variability and Dean of the Division of Biomechanics and Research Development at UNO. Dr. Stergiou is also a professor at the College of Public Health at the University of Nebraska Medical Center.

Education 
Dr. Stergiou earned his bachelor's degree from Aristotle University of Thessaloniki in 1989. He then moved to the United States and earned a Master of Science from the University of Nebraska at Omaha. As a graduate assistant his research focused on the design of running shoes. After earning his master's degree, he moved to Eugene, Oregon, to complete his doctorate at the University of Oregon studying biomechanics, motor control and mathematics. After earning his PhD in biomechanics, Dr. Stergiou returned to Greece to complete his mandatory military enlistment and served as a sergeant in the Army infantry.

Academic appointments 
In 1996, Dr. Stergiou returned to Omaha and became an assistant professor in the School of Health, Physical Education and Recreation at UNO. He taught classes ranging from basic anatomy and physiology to advanced biomechanics. 

Dr. Stergiou created the UNO Department of Biomechanics and the UNO Center for Research in Human Movement Variability. Both units are the first of their kind in the world. He has been the only UNO faculty member to serve on the University of Nebraska Medical Center Graduate Council and serve as a chair of a graduate program at the University of Nebraska Medical Center. He has a paid faculty appointment at the College of Public Health for many years and he has held adjunct faculty appointments at various departments at the University of Nebraska Medical Center, UNO, and the University of Nebraska Lincoln. He has developed PhD programs at the College of Public Health of the University of Nebraska Medical Center and the College of Engineering of the University of Nebraska Lincoln. He graduated the first doctoral student from the University of Nebraska Lincoln Biomedical Engineering PhD program. He has also led the approval of the doctoral program in exercise science at UNO in 2012, which was the first approved standalone doctoral program at this university. He also organized the entire program and developed the entire curriculum as the first Chair of the Doctoral Program Committee. He has led the development of a BS program in Biomechanics which is just the third such program in the nation. UNO and his Department of Biomechanics is now offering a master's degree in Biomechanics and a PhD in Biomechanics and Kinesiology.

UNO recently developed the Division of Biomechanics and Research Development, which engulfes the Department of Biomechanics and the Center for Research in Human Movement Variabilityand is housed in the Biomechanics Research Building. Dr. Stergiou was appointed as the director of the division named assistant dean of the Division of Biomechanics and Research Development.

Professional accomplishments 

Dr. Stergiou is known for being a passionate proponent of biomechanics research  In addition, he is the first UNO faculty to ever obtain enough private funding to construct an entirely new building for his discipline and one of the few in the world. He was able to transform his 900 square foot laboratory into a 23,000 square foot building by securing a $6 million private donation. The Biomechanics Research Building opened in 2013 and Dr. Stergiou moved his research team of 25 scientists into this state-of-the-art unique research environment. However, subsequent growth resulted in the Biomechanics Research Building currently housing over 70 faculty, staff and students, as well as being the home of the UNO Department of Biomechanics which is the first research focused department of this university. Therefore, Dr. Stergiou raised another $12 million to expand the building by 30,000 square feet. The UNO's Biomechanics Research Building, is the only research building on the UNO campus, and one of the world's first buildings dedicated to biomechanics research.

Dr. Stergiou has mentored hundreds of undergraduate and graduate students, doctoral candidates, and post-doctoral fellows in fields related to biomechanics and human movement variability. He is the only UNO faculty member that had four post-doctoral researchers every year for more than five years. He is responsible for fourteen inventions in biomechanics, including the development of a concussion development platform in 2016. He is the author of Innovative Analyses of Human Movement and Nonlinear Analysis for Human Movement Variability, and has published over 200 peer-reviewed articles.

As an international authority of nonlinear dynamics in biomechanics, Dr. Stergiou has spoken all over the world. His reputation has also attracted an international array of physicians and clinicians to attend the Nonlinear Analysis Workshop in Omaha, and the Biomechanics Research Building staff has hosted visiting scholars from Norway, Japan, Greece, France, and many more.

Dr. Stergiou has been highlighted several times by the University of Nebraska Foundation and the University President, to our alumni and donors as an exemplary faculty with speeches at Palm Springs, California, Scottsdale, Arizona and Lincoln, Nebraska. He was the first inductee from Nebraska to the National Academy of Kinesiology. Dr. Stergiou is the only UNO faculty that received the Outstanding Teacher of the Year Award, the Outstanding Researcher of the Year Award, the Outstanding Graduate Mentor Award, and as the Director of Nebraska Biomechanics Core Facility, the Chancellor's Academic Excellence Award. He has participated in grant reviewing for the National Science Foundation, the United States Department of Veterans Affairs, and the National Institutes of Health (NIH) study sections as well as for many countries around the globe. He has received more than 40 million dollars in grants from NIH, NASA, NSF, the NIDRR/US Department of Education, and many other agencies and foundations.

Dr. Stergiou has also been rewarded with numerous awards and honors. He is the only UNO faculty with a named professorship designed specifically for him; the Distinguished Community Chair in Biomechanics. If he leaves from UNO, this chair position will be called the Stergiou Chair in Biomechanics. Most recently, he earned a Fulbright Scholarship to spend time in Portugal. Dr. Stergiou's funding is a list of sources ranging from the Nebraska Research Initiative to the NSF and the NIH. His most notable award is a P20 grant for $10 million from the National Institute of General Medical Sciences at the NIH. This is the largest grant in UNO history to date. In 2017, Dr. Stergiou was given the chancellor's Medal for the Commencement in May of that year. Dr. Stergiou was awarded the UNEMED (University of Nebraska Medicine) Innovator of the year in the Department of Biomechanics, along with the Innovation, Development and Engagement Award (IDEA) in 2018 at the University of Nebraska.

References

1. ^ "Curriculum Vitae: Nicholas Stergiou". University of Nebraska Omaha. Retrieved 29 November 2016.

2.^ Ruggles, Rick. "$6 Million Research Building Will Give UNO a Leg up in Biomechanics". Omaha World Herald. Berkshire Hathaway. Retrieved 29 November 2016.

3. ^ Litton, Charles. "UNeMed Startup MotoMetrix Joins Straight Shot Class of '16 - UNeMed". UNeMed. University of Nebraska. Retrieved 29 November 2016.

4. ^ Stergiou, Nicholas (2004). Innovative Analyses of Human Movement (1st ed.). .

5. ^ Stergiou, Nicholas (26 January 2016). Nonlinear Analysis for Human Movement Variability. CRC Press. .

6. ^ "Nicholas Stergiou". CRC Press Online. Taylor & Francis Group. Retrieved 29 November 2016.

Living people
1965 births
American male writers
American roboticists
University of Nebraska Omaha faculty